Tricorythopsis is a genus of little stout crawler mayflies in the family Leptohyphidae. There are more than 20 described species in Tricorythopsis.

Species
These 21 species belong to the genus Tricorythopsis:

 Tricorythopsis acara Belmont, Salles & Hamada, 2011
 Tricorythopsis araponga Dias & Salles, 2005
 Tricorythopsis ariagas
 Tricorythopsis artigas Traver, 1958
 Tricorythopsis bahiensis Dias, Salles & Ferreira, 2008
 Tricorythopsis baptistai Dias & Salles, 2005
 Tricorythopsis chiriguano Molineri, 2001
 Tricorythopsis faeculopsis Belmont, Salles & Hamada, 2011
 Tricorythopsis gibbus (Allen, 1967)
 Tricorythopsis intercalatus Belmont, Salles & Hamada, 2011
 Tricorythopsis minimus (Allen, 1973)
 Tricorythopsis pseudogibbus Dias & Salles, 2005
 Tricorythopsis rondoniensis (Dias, Cruz & Ferreira, 2009)
 Tricorythopsis sigillatus Molineri, 1999
 Tricorythopsis spongicola Lima, Salles & Pinheiro, 2011
 Tricorythopsis ticuna Molineri & Zuniga, 2006
 Tricorythopsis undulatus (Allen, 1967)
 Tricorythopsis volsellus Molineri, 1999
 Tricorythopsis yacutinga Molineri, 2001
 Tricorythopsis yucupe Dias, Salles & Ferreira, 2008
 Tricorythopsis yusuaia

References

Further reading

 
 

Mayflies
Articles created by Qbugbot